Phthersigena is an Australasian genus of praying mantids: in the subfamily Fulciniinae and tribe Paraoxypilini.  It is one of several genera containing certain species called "unicorn mantids", due to a process on their heads.

Species
The Mantodea Species File lists:
subgenus Glabromantis Sjostedt, 1918
 Phthersigena minor Sjostedt, 1918
 Phthersigena nebulosa Sjostedt, 1918
subgenus Phthersigena Stal, 1871
 Phthersigena centralis Giglio-Tos, 1915
 Phthersigena conspersa Stal, 1871 - type species
 Phthersigena insularis Beier, 1965
 Phthersigena melania Tindale, 1923
 Phthersigena pallidifemur Tindale, 1923
 Phthersigena timorensis Beier, 1952
 Phthersigena unicornis Tindale, 1923

References

External links 

Mantodea genera
Nanomantidae